The Roman Catholic Diocese of Yujiang/Yükíang is a diocese located in Yujiang (Jiangxi) in the Ecclesiastical province of Nanchang in China.

History
 August 28, 1885: Established as the Apostolic Vicariate of Eastern Kiangsi 江西東境 from the  Apostolic Vicariate of Northern Kiangsi 江西北境
 August 25, 1920: Renamed as Apostolic Vicariate of Fuzhou 抚州
 June 1, 1921: Renamed as Apostolic Vicariate of Yujiang 餘江
 April 11, 1946: Promoted as Diocese of Yujiang 餘江

Leadership
 Bishops of Yujiang 餘江 (Roman rite)
 Bishop John Peng Weizhao (2014–), from 2012 as Apostolic Administrator
 Bishop Thomas Zeng Jing-mu (1988 – 2012)
 Bishop William Charles Quinn, C.M. (April 11, 1946 – March 12, 1960)
 Vicars Apostolic of Yujiang 餘江 (Roman Rite)
 Bishop William Charles Quinn, C.M. (May 28, 1940 – April 11, 1946)
 Bishop Paul Bergan Misner, C.M. (December 10, 1934 – November 3, 1938)
 Bishop Edward T. Sheehan, C.M. (February 4, 1929 – September 9, 1933)
 Bishop Jean-Louis Clerc-Renaud, C.M. (August 19, 1912 – January 5, 1928)
 Vicars Apostolic of Eastern Kiangsi 江西東境 (Roman Rite)
 Bishop Casimir Vic, C.M. (July 11, 1885 – June 2, 1912)

References

 GCatholic.org
 Catholic Hierarchy

Roman Catholic dioceses in China
Religious organizations established in 1885
Roman Catholic dioceses and prelatures established in the 19th century
1885 establishments in China
Religion in Jiangxi
Yingtan